The Vaal Triangle is a triangular area formed by Vereeniging, Vanderbijlpark and Sasolburg about 60 km south of Johannesburg, South Africa. The area forms a substantial urban complex. Meyerton, just north of Vereeniging, is also generally included in the complex, and residents of Sharpeville, Boipatong, Bophelong, the greater Sebokeng area (including Evaton, Orange Farm, etc.), Three Rivers, Heidelberg, Deneysville and Potchefstroom also generally tend to consider themselves to live in the Vaal Triangle. The area straddles the Vaal River and is a major industrial region, which is home to former Iron and Steel Corporation Iscor, now ArcelorMittal South Africa, and Sasol, respectively the steel and petrochemical processing facilities.

In 2013, research by the Council for Scientific and Industrial Research (CSIR) revealed that areas in the Vaal Triangle have persistently higher concentrations of air pollutants such as nitrogen dioxide, than in the rest of South Africa. Due to the heavy industries in and around the Vaal Triangle it became infamous for its air pollution and respiratory disease. For this reason, local Afrikaans speaking people often refer to the region as the Vuil Driehoek (meaning Dirty Triangle) as a pun on Vaal Driehoek (the Afrikaans translation for Vaal Triangle).

Nearby is the Vaal Dam, from which the massive PWV megalopolis (Pretoria, Witwatersrand and Vereeniging) draws its water. The PWV forms the urban heart of Gauteng province. The Witwatersrand is the name given to the area that comprises the Greater Johannesburg metropole and the gold-bearing reef along which gold was discovered in 1886.

The Vaal Dam is well-patronised by people from Johannesburg over the weekends and during holidays, as it provides extensive water recreation facilities some 70 km south of the city.

References

External links
 Vaal Triangle University Campus - North-West University

Geography of Gauteng